Simon Wing Hang Leung (born 24 November 1996) is an Australian badminton player specializing in doubles. He won the mixed doubles Oceania Championships title in 2019 and 2020.

Leung represented Australia at the 2020 Summer Olympics. As a mixed doubles badminton team, he and his partner, Gronya Somerville, were placed in the group with the eventual Japanese bronze medalists, and were not able to pick up a win.

Early years 
Leung was only 6 years old when started playing badminton. His whole family played badminton and he started competing in his home city of Brisbane. 

Leung began competing professionally in 2010. He competed at the under 15 nationals and was part of the National Junior team until 2014. He represented Australia at the 2013 Oceania Championships and at the 2017 World Championships in Glasgow.

Achievements

Oceania Championships 
Men's doubles

Mixed doubles

BWF International Challenge/Series (2 runners-up) 
Men's doubles

Mixed doubles

  BWF International Challenge tournament
  BWF International Series tournament
  BWF Future Series tournament

References

External links 
 

1996 births
Living people
Sportspeople from Brisbane
Australian people of Hong Kong descent
Australian male badminton players
Badminton players at the 2020 Summer Olympics
Olympic badminton players of Australia
Sportsmen from Queensland